DAML may refer to: 

DARPA Agent Markup Language, a markup language for the Semantic Web
Digitally Added Main Line, a method for multiplexing, i.e. transmitting and receiving multiple telephone transmission signals over a single twisted pair
 Digital Asset Modeling Language, a "smart contract" language